Kansai International Airport commonly known as   is the primary international airport in the Greater Osaka Area of Japan and the closest international airport to the cities of Osaka, Kyoto, and Kobe.

Kansai opened on 4 September 1994 to relieve overcrowding at the original Osaka International Airport, referred to as Itami Airport, which is closer to the city of Osaka. It consists of two terminals: Terminal 1 and Terminal 2. The airport serves as an international hub for All Nippon Airways, Japan Airlines, and Nippon Cargo Airlines, and also serves as a hub for Peach, the first international low-cost carrier in Japan.

In 2016, 25.2 million passengers used the airport, making it the 30th busiest airport in Asia and third busiest in Japan. The freight volume was 802,162 tonnes total: 757,414 t international (18th in the world) and 44,748 t domestic. The  second runway was opened on 2 August 2007. , Kansai Airport has become an Asian hub, with 780 weekly flights to Asia and Australasia (including freight 119), 59 weekly flights to Europe and the Middle East (freight 5), and 80 weekly flights to North America (freight 42).

In 2020, Kansai received Skytrax's awards for Best Airport Staff in Asia, World's Best Airport Staff, and World's Best Airport for Baggage Delivery.

History 

In the 1960s, when the Kansai region was rapidly losing trade to Tokyo, planners proposed a new airport near Kobe and Osaka. The city's original international airport, Itami Airport, located in the densely populated suburbs of Itami and Toyonaka, was surrounded by buildings; it could not be expanded, and many of its neighbours had filed complaints because of noise pollution problems.

After the protests surrounding New Tokyo International Airport (now Narita International Airport), which was built with expropriated land in a rural part of Chiba Prefecture, planners decided to build the airport offshore. The new airport was part of a number of new developments to revitalize Osaka, which had been losing economic and cultural ground to Tokyo for most of the century.

Initially, the airport was planned to be built near Kobe, but the city of Kobe refused the plan, so the airport was moved to a more southerly location on Osaka Bay. There it could be open 24 hours per day, unlike its predecessor in the city.

Construction

Engineers needed to overcome the extremely high risks of earthquakes and typhoons (with storm surges of up to ). A million sand drains were built into the clay to remove water and solidify the clay.

Construction started in 1987. The sea wall was finished in 1989 (made of rock and 48,000 tetrapods). Over three years, 10,000 workers using 80 ships took 10 million man-hours to complete the  layer of earth over the sea floor and inside the sea wall. In 1990, a  bridge was completed to connect the island to the mainland at Rinku Town, at a cost of $1 billion. Completion of the artificial island increased the area of Osaka Prefecture just enough so that it is no longer the smallest prefecture in Japan (Kagawa Prefecture is now the smallest).

The bidding and construction of the airport was a source of international trade friction during the late 1980s and early 1990s. Prime Minister Yasuhiro Nakasone responded to American concerns, particularly from Senator Frank Murkowski, that bids would be rigged in Japanese companies' favour by providing special offices for prospective international contractors, which ultimately did little to ease the participation of foreign contractors in the bidding process. Later, foreign airlines complained that two-thirds of the departure hall counter space had been allocated to Japanese carriers, disproportionately to the actual carriage of passengers through the airport.

The island had been predicted to sink  by the most optimistic estimate as the weight of the material used for construction compressed the seabed silts. However, by 1999, the island had sunk  – almost 50% more than predicted. The project became the most expensive civil works project in modern history after twenty years of planning, three years of construction and US$15bn of investment. Much of what was learned went into the successful artificial islands in silt deposits for New Kitakyushu Airport, Kobe Airport, and Chūbu Centrair International Airport. The lessons of Kansai Airport were also applied in the construction of Hong Kong International Airport.

In 1991, the terminal construction commenced. To compensate for the sinking of the island, adjustable columns were designed to support the terminal building. These are extended by inserting thick metal plates at their bases. Government officials proposed reducing the length of the terminal to cut costs, but architect Renzo Piano insisted on keeping the terminal at its full planned length. The airport was opened on 4 September 1994.

Due to its earthquake engineering, the airport emerged unscathed, mostly due to the use of sliding joints. Even the glass in the windows remained intact.

On 19 April 2001, the airport was one of ten structures given the "Civil Engineering Monument of the Millennium" award by the American Society of Civil Engineers.

, the total cost of Kansai Airport was $20 billion including land reclamation, two runways, terminals, and facilities. Most additional costs were initially due to the island sinking, expected due to the soft soils of Osaka Bay. After construction the rate of sinking was considered so severe that the airport was widely criticized as a geotechnical engineering disaster.

Operation

Opened on 4 September 1994, the airport serves as a hub for several airlines such as All Nippon Airways, Japan Airlines, and Nippon Cargo Airlines. It is the international gateway for Japan's Kansai region, which contains the major cities of Kyoto, Kobe, and Osaka. Other Kansai domestic flights fly from the older but more conveniently located Osaka International Airport in Itami, or from the newer Kobe Airport.

The airport had been deeply in debt, losing $560 million in interest every year. Airlines had been kept away by high landing fees (about $7,500 for a Boeing 747), the second most expensive in the world after Narita's. In the early years of the airport's operation, excessive terminal rent and utility bills for on-site concessions also drove up operating costs: some estimates before opening held that a cup of coffee would have to cost US$10. Osaka business owners pressed the government to take a greater burden of the construction cost to keep the airport attractive to passengers and airlines.

On 17 February 2005, Chubu Centrair International Airport opened in Nagoya, just east of Osaka. The opening of the airport was expected to increase competition between Japan's international airports. Despite this, passenger totals were up 11% in 2005 over 2004, and international passengers increased to 3.06 million in 2006, up 10% over 2005. The main rationale behind the expansions was to compete with Incheon International Airport and Hong Kong International Airport as a gateway to Asia, as Tokyo area airports were severely congested. Kansai saw a 5% year-on-year increase in international traffic in summer 2013, largely supported by low-cost carrier traffic to Taiwan and Southeast Asia overcoming a decrease in traffic to China and South Korea.

The airport authority was allotted four billion yen in government support for fiscal year 2013, and the Ministry of Land, Infrastructure, and Transport and the Ministry of Finance agreed to reduce this amount in stages through fiscal year 2015, although local governments in the Kansai region have pressed for continued subsidies.

Kansai has been marketed as an alternative to Narita Airport for international travelers from the Greater Tokyo Area. By flying to Kansai from Haneda Airport and connecting to international flights there, travelers can save the additional time required to get to Narita: up to one and a half hours for many residents of Kanagawa Prefecture and southern Tokyo.

Expansion

The airport was at its limit during peak times, owing especially to freight flights, so a portion of Phase II expansion—the second runway—was made a priority. Thus, in 2003, believing that the sinking problem was almost over, the airport operators started to construct a  second runway and terminal.

The second runway opened on 2 August 2007, but with the originally planned terminal portion postponed. This lowered the project cost to JPY¥910 billion (approx. US$8 billion), saving ¥650 billion from the first estimate. The second runway is used for landings and when there are incidents prohibiting takeoff from runway A. The new runway allowed the airport to start 24-hour operations in September 2007.

A new terminal building opened in late 2012. However, the Japanese government has currently postponed these plans for economic reasons.

Relationship with Itami Airport

Since July 2008, Osaka Prefecture governor Toru Hashimoto has been a vocal critic of Itami Airport, arguing that the Chuo Shinkansen maglev line will make much of its domestic role irrelevant, and that its domestic functions should be transferred to Kansai Airport in conjunction with upgraded high-speed access to Kansai from central Osaka. In 2009, Hashimoto also publicly proposed moving the functions of Marine Corps Air Station Futenma to Kansai Airport as a possible solution for the political crisis surrounding the base.

In May 2011, the Diet of Japan passed legislation to form a new Kansai International Airport Corporation using the state's existing equity stake in Kansai Airport and its property holdings at Itami Airport. The move was aimed at offsetting Kansai Airport's debt burden.

The merger of the Itami and Kansai airport authorities was completed in July 2012. Shortly following the merger, Kansai Airport announced a 5% reduction in landing fees effective October 2012, with additional reductions during overnight hours when the airport is underutilized, and further discounts planned for the future, including subsidies for new airlines and routes.  these moves were intended to bring Kansai's fees closer to the level of Narita International Airport, where landing fees were around 20% lower than Kansai's, and to improve competitiveness with other Asian hubs such as Incheon International Airport in South Korea.

Since its formation, the new operating company has also made efforts toward international expansion, bidding for operating concessions at Yangon International Airport and Hanthawaddy International Airport in Myanmar.

KIAC conducted a public tender to sell the operating rights for Kansai and Itami Airport in May 2015. Orix and Vinci SA were the sole bidders for the 45-year contract, at a price of around $18 billion. The new operating company, Kansai Airports, took over on 1 April 2016. It is 80% owned by Orix and Vinci, with the remaining 20% owned by Kansai-based enterprises such as Hankyu Hanshin Holdings and Panasonic.

Typhoon Jebi
On 4 September 2018, the airport was hit by Typhoon Jebi. The airport had to pause operations after seawater surges inundated the island; runways were hit, and the water reached up to the engines of some aircraft. The situation was further exacerbated when a large tanker crashed into the bridge that links the airport to the mainland, effectively stranding the people remaining at the airport. All flights at the airport were cancelled until 6 September, at which date Prime Minister Shinzō Abe announced the airport would partially resume domestic operations.

Train services to the airport resumed from 18 September 2018 after repair works to the Kansai Airport Line and Nankai Airport Line were completed, and the airport resumed regular operations on 1 October 2018. Repairs to the damaged section of the Sky Gate Bridge R were finally completed on 8 April 2019, restoring traffic both to and from the mainland completely.

Terminals

Terminal 1
It has a sophisticated people mover system called the Wing Shuttle, which moves passengers from one end of the pier to the other.

The terminal's roof is shaped like an airfoil. This shape is used to promote air circulation through the building: giant air conditioning ducts blow air upwards at one side of the terminal, circulate the air across the curvature of the ceiling, and collect the air through intakes at the other side. Mobiles are suspended in the ticketing hall to take advantage of the flowing air.

The ticketing hall overlooks the international departures concourse, and the two are separated by a glass partition. During Kansai's early days, visitors were known to throw objects over the partition to friends in the corridor below. The partition was eventually modified to halt this practice.

On June 23, 2017, at the terminal's promotion space, a game experience area known as "Nintendo Check In" opened. In this game experience area, guests arriving at Terminal 1 can play Nintendo Switch games free of charge. There is a statue of Mario at the experience area, along with Super Mario Cappy caps from Super Mario Odyssey for passengers to take photos with. There also Amiibo figurines on display there. In the northern and southern arrival routes of Terminal 1, there are decorations of Nintendo characters like Mario, Luigi, Princess Peach, and others welcoming arriving passengers.

Terminal 2

Terminal 2 is a low-cost carrier (LCC) terminal designed to attract more LCCs by providing lower landing fees than Terminal 1. It is exclusively occupied by Peach, Spring Airlines, and Jeju Air. Other LCCs serving Kansai, such as Jetstar Airways, Jetstar Japan, and Cebu Pacific, use the main Terminal 1.

Peach requested that Terminal 2 have a simplified design in order to minimize operating costs. The terminal is a single-story building, thus eliminating the cost of elevators. Passageways to aircraft have no air conditioning. The terminal also has no jet bridges, having one boarding gate for domestic departures and one boarding gate for international departures. In case of rain, passengers are lent umbrellas to use as they walk to the aircraft.

Terminal 2 is not directly connected to Terminal 1 or to Kansai Airport Station. Free shuttle buses run between the two terminals, and between Terminal 2 and the railway and ferry stations. It is also possible to walk between the terminals through the KIX Sora Park, a four-hectare park located adjacent to Terminal 2.

Statistics

Airlines and destinations

Passenger

Cargo

Ground transportation

Rail 
Kansai International Airport is connected only by the Sky Gate Bridge R and by a road and railroad bridge to Rinku Town and the mainland. The lower railroad level of the bridge is used by two railroad operators: JR West and Nankai Electric Railway.

JR West operates the Haruka limited express train services for Kansai Airport Station from Tennōji, Ōsaka, Shin-Ōsaka, and Kyoto Station. JR West also offers  services for Kansai Airport Station from Ōsaka, Kyōbashi and several stations on the way, with connecting train service to Wakayama available at Hineno Station. Various connections, such as buses, subways, trams, and other railroads, are available at each station.

Nankai operates the rapi:t, a limited express train service to Namba Station on the southern edge of downtown Osaka. Osaka Metro connections are available at Namba and Tengachaya Station.

Rail connections to and from Kansai Airport are expected to further improve access to and from Umeda with the opening of the Naniwasuji Line in 2031.

Bus 
Kansai Airport Transportation Enterprise and other bus operators offer scheduled express bus services, called "Airport Limousines", for Kansai International Airport.

Parking 
Two six storey parking structures, called P1 and P2, are located above a railroad terminal station, while the other two level parking facilities, called P3 and P4, are situated next to "Aeroplaza", a hotel complex.

The airport is only accessible from the Sky Gate Bridge R, a part of Kansai Airport Expressway. The expressway immediately connects to Hanshin Expressways Route 5, "Wangan Route", and Hanwa Expressway.

Ferry service 

In July 2007, high-speed ferry service began. OM Kobe operates "Bay Shuttle" between Kobe Airport and KIX. The journey takes about thirty minutes.

Other facilities 

  – Houses the 
 
 The Peach Aviation head office is on the fifth floor.
  is located on the west side of Kansai Airport Station. It includes a hotel, restaurants, rental car counters, and other businesses
 Hotel Nikko Kansai Airport (north portion of Kansai Airport)
 Head office of Peach Aviation was previously located on the third floor (central portion of Kansai Airport)
 Central power station (KEPCO) energy center, 40 MW
 JAL Cargo import and export facilities (in southern portion)
 Japan Coast Guard Kansai airport Coast Guard air base
 Japan Coast Guard Special Security Team Base
 Osaka international post office ( carrying about 19,000 tonnes per year of international postal matter)
 Oil tanker berths (three berths) and Fuel Supply center
The double-decker bridge consists of a lower deck devoted to rail, with the upper for road.

See also 
 Kansai Airports
 Kobe Airport
 Itami Airport

References

Further reading
 Hausler, E. and N. Sitar. "Performance of Soil Improvement Techniques in Earthquakes." (Archive) (Report in Progress) Pacific Earthquake Engineering Research Center, University of California Berkeley.

External links 

 
 History of KIX at Kansai Airports
 Kansai International Airport Land Co., Ltd.
 Kansai International Airport Project by Focchi Group

1994 establishments in Japan
Airports established in 1994
Airports in Japan
Artificial island airports
Artificial islands of Japan
Buildings and structures in Osaka Prefecture
Kansai region
Ove Arup buildings and structures
Renzo Piano buildings
Transport in Osaka Prefecture
Izumisano
Sennan, Osaka
Tajiri, Osaka